Andronikos Kantakouzenos may refer to:

 Andronikos Palaiologos Kantakouzenos (died 1453), Byzantine statesman
 Andronikos Kantakouzenos (1553–1601), Ottoman and Wallachian statesman